Yuvvh (2012) is a Malayalam music album released in 2012 by Sony Music.

Tracks

The music was composed by Saachin and Sreejith, for the lyrics penned by Naveen Marar. "Nenjodu Cherthu" sung by Aalap Raju was an instant hit on YouTube.Produced by Chelorys media, the song Nenjodu Cherthu from Yuvvh got more than 200,000 hits within 4 days of release by Sony Music.

Music videos
The video directed by Alphonse Putharen  featured Nivin Pauly and Nazriya Nazim.

References

External links
 
 Sony Music and ‘Yuvvh’ storm the music scene in Kerala!

Malayalam music albums
Hip hop albums by Indian artists
2012 albums
World music albums by Indian artists